HMS Wakeful was a W-class destroyer of the Royal Navy, built under the 1916–1917 Programme in the 10th Destroyer order. Wakeful was assigned to the Grand Fleet after completion, and served into the early years of the Second World War. Wakeful was torpedoed and sunk during Operation Dynamo by a German E-Boat on 29 May 1940.

Career

First World War
Wakeful joined the Grand Fleet and was present at the surrender of the German High Seas Fleet in 1918. She then went into reserve.

Second World War
Just prior to the start of the war in August 1939 Wakeful was reactivated and recommissioned to attend the Royal Review of the Reserve Fleet in Weymouth Bay.  At the outbreak of war Wakeful was assigned to convoy escort duty with the 17th Destroyer Flotilla, which was part of the Western Approaches Command.

Operation Dynamo
Wakeful was selected to support Operation Dynamo, the evacuation of allied troops from Dunkirk, on 26 May 1940.  On 27 May 1940  Wakeful embarked 631 Allied troops. While returning them to Dover Wakeful came under air attack and received minor damage below the waterline.  Despite the near miss Wakeful returned to Dunkirk to continue the evacuation, embarking 640 Allied troops on 28 May 1940.  While carrying this out Wakeful was torpedoed by the German E-Boat S-30. The destroyer was struck by two torpedoes, one hitting the forward boiler room. Casualties were heavy, only four of the 640 Allied troops – Sapper Michael Frazer of the Royal Engineers, Mr Stanley Patrick of the Royal Army Service Corps and Mr H.F.R. Ruddell of the Royal Army Service Corps and Mr James 'Jim' Kane of the Royal Tank Regiment  plus 25 of Wakefuls crew survived.  A number of ships stopped to pick up the survivors, but one of these, the destroyer , was then in turn sunk by a German U-boat.

Wreck 
In 2003, work was done to remove parts of the superstructure and funnel that were considered to be a potential danger to navigation; the recovered ship's crest and foot plate are now placed in the National Museum of the Royal Navy.

Notes

Bibliography

External links
 www.naval-history.net
 http://uboat.net
 http://www.culture24.org.uk/history-and-heritage/military-history/world-war-two/art22986

 

V and W-class destroyers of the Royal Navy
Ships built on the River Clyde
1917 ships
World War I destroyers of the United Kingdom
World War II destroyers of the United Kingdom
Maritime incidents in May 1940